Stanjevića Rupa is a village in the municipality of Podgorica, Montenegro. It is located near Spuž, Danilovgrad Municipality.

Demographics
According to the 2011 census, its population was 211.

References

Populated places in Podgorica Municipality